Poliopastea laciades is a moth of the family Erebidae. It was described by William Schaus in 1889. It is found in Mexico.

References

Poliopastea
Moths described in 1889
Taxa named by William Schaus